Iris was a British car brand that was manufactured from 1906 to 1925 by Legros & Knowles Ltd in Willesden, London and Aylesbury, Buckinghamshire.

History

The Iris Motor Co, was established at Holland St, Brixton, London, in 1902. It made motorcycles until 1904 and later the Iris car.

Legros & Knowles
Lucien Alphonse Legros (1866-1933), O.B.E., M.I.Mech.E., M.I.C.E., son of the artist Alphonse Legros, and Guy Knowles, scion of a wealthy and artistic family, founded Legros & Knowles Ltd in Cumberland Park, Willesden Junction, Willesden, London in 1904 to build and repair vehicles. They had met while Knowles was studying art under Alphonze Legros. Knowles provided most of the financial capital while Legros, an older, experienced tramway engineer, was the main designer.

Two Legros & Knowles vehicles were shown at the 1904 Olympia Show, but they were cumbersome, outdated designs with chain drive, slow revving engines and magneto ignition. They were subsequently referred to as the 'Old Buggerinas'.

Iris Cars
From 1904, Legros & Knowles manufactured Iris cars.

In November 1905, a new Iris model appeared with shaft drive and the diamond shaped radiator. It was designed by Ivon M. de Havilland, elder brother of Sir Geoffrey de Havilland, who had been at Harrow school with Knowles ten years earlier. (Note - de Havilland died approximately a year later.) Also in 1905, some marine units were built, based on the original Legros engine design, one of which was installed in the motor yacht Iris at the Southampton trials.

By 1907, Frank T. Burgess was involved with the design at Iris. He later designed both the 1914 T.T. Humber and the 3 litre Bentley for W. O. Bentley.

In 1907, Iris Cars Ltd was founded as a distribution company for the production models. It collapsed in 1908 (or 1909).

The factory in Willesden was quite small, comprising a machine shop, engine room which drove all the machinery, the erecting shop with space for four chassis, and the blacksmith's shop. Upstairs, there was a light machine shop, fitting shop, parts store and pattern maker's shop. A separate building contained the office, the drawing office, and engine test-shop. There was no foundry. The total workforce was less than 60.

In 1908/9, Iris Cars Ltd opened showrooms in Marshall Street, off Oxford Street, London, which took over the marketing of all the production from Willesden.

In 1909, Legros and Knowles created a new Service department for Iris Cars Ltd, headquartered in Aylesbury and headed by George Augustus Mower. It was associated with Mower's Bifurcated Rivet and Tubular Rivet Company, on the Mandeville Road, Aylesbury.

C.K. Edwards was the Iris designer until 1911. In 1913, construction ceased in Willesden.

Production in Aylesbury stopped in 1915 with the outbreak of the First World War.

In 1919, the last vehicle was created but three models were offered until 1925. There is only a single known surviving vehicle, a British owned 1912 tourer registration FR 611 (pictured above).

Aero engine
In 1909, Sir Geoffrey de Havilland contracted Iris to build his first aero engine, the de Havilland Iris, a four-cylinder, liquid-cooled, horizontally opposed unit, which was displayed at the Aero Show in Olympia in March 2010.

Etymology
The car was named after the Greek goddess Iris, The Speedy Messenger of the Gods, who was portrayed on the badge of the early cars. By 1907, the advertising slogan was It Runs in Silence and this was implied as the origin of the name. From 1909, the logo, designed by Clive Harrington, showed green and blue Iris flowers.

Vehicles

The only Legros & Knowles model had a four-cylinder engine with 20 hp power.

The Iris cars were luxury vehicles with large, water-cooled four-cylinder in-line engines. Between 1906 and 1908, a six-cylinder 40 HP was available, but it is probable that only one unit was built. A striking feature of all models was the diamond shaped radiator grille.

Models

See also
 de Havilland Iris -  four-cylinder, horizontally opposed aero engine.

References

Other sources 

 Harald Linz, Halwart Schrader: Die Internationale Automobil-Enzyklopädie. United Soft Media Verlag, München 2008, . 
 George Nick Georgano (Chefredakteur): The Beaulieu Encyclopedia of the Automobile. Volume 1: A–F. Fitzroy Dearborn Publishers, Chicago 2001, . (englisch)
 David Culshaw, Peter Horrobin: The Complete Catalogue of British Cars 1895–1975. Veloce Publishing plc., Dorchester 1999, .
Further reading

Defunct motor vehicle manufacturers of England
Companies based in the London Borough of Lambeth
Companies based in Buckinghamshire
Vehicles introduced in 1906
1900s cars
1910s cars
1920s cars
Vehicle manufacturing companies established in 1906
1906 establishments in England
Defunct companies of England
Brass Era vehicles